Andrew Newell (born 13 November 1865, date of death unknown) was an Australian cricketer. He played twenty-five first-class matches for New South Wales between 1889/90 and 1899/1900.

Newell, a right-arm off-spin and medium-pace bowler, was the most successful bowler in Sydney grade cricket in 1892-93, when he took 60 wickets for Glebe at an average of 5.43. At the end of that season he took 6 for 25 and 4 for 27 for New South Wales in a low-scoring match against Queensland that Queensland won by 17 runs. His best innings figures for New South Wales were 8 for 56 against Victoria in 1897-98.

In November 1907 Newell was living with his wife in the Sydney suburb of Woollahra and working as a clerk in the Postal Department. He had been receiving medical treatment for a nervous condition, and had had to take a break from playing cricket, when he disappeared while walking his dogs. He was assumed to have died, but in early 1911 a friend in Sydney received a letter from him, sent from Valparaiso, Chile, where he had been living for some time under an assumed name.

See also
 List of New South Wales representative cricketers

References

External links
 

1865 births
20th-century deaths
Australian cricketers
New South Wales cricketers